Reverend King may refer to:
 Martin Luther King Jr., an American Baptist minister and civil rights activist from 1954 through 1968
 Martin Luther King Sr., an American Baptist minister and father of Martin Luther King, Jr.
 Reverend King (Nigerian pastor), a Nigerian pastor convicted of murder